KM Music Conservatory (KMMC) is a higher education institution founded in 2008 by the A. R. Rahman foundation. Located in Arumbakkam, Chennai, in the Indian state of Tamil Nadu, the conservatory offers a range of part-time and full-time courses in Hindustani and Western classical music and music technology. Composer A. R. Rahman is the founder and principal, Fathima Rafiq the executive director.

Faculty

Courses at KMMC are taught by an international group of full-time and part-time faculty from India, Europe and the US, specialising in musical performance, music theory and analysis, music history, musicology and music technology. Faculty experience includes professional work in the music industry as well as academic expertise in teaching and researching music in higher education.

KMMC is developing a newly founded symphony orchestra, to serve as resident studio orchestra for AR Rahman's compositions and to perform for the general public in Chennai and elsewhere in India.

In 2009 Sri Lankan composer Dinesh Subasinghe and Bangladesh composer Emon Saha became the first international students to join KMMC.

KM College of Music and Technology
KMMC became a full-fledged college offering degrees and diplomas in 2013.
Students of KM have participated for the great composer and its founder A.R.Rahman's many movie scores, concerts and Audio CDs. Their first-ever official release was Rhyme Skool with Katrina Kaif with Sa Re Ga Ma Productions and Katrina Kaif.

References

A. R. Rahman
Music schools in India
Cultural centres in Chennai
Universities and colleges in Chennai
Educational institutions established in 2008
2008 establishments in Tamil Nadu